Savia is a genus of the family Phyllanthaceae first described as a genus in 1806. It is native to the West Indies, the Florida Keys, Mexico, Venezuela, Brazil, and Paraguay.

species
 Savia dictyocarpa Müll.Arg. - Paraguay, S Brazil
 Savia sessiliflora (Sw.) Willd. - Mexico (Nayarit + Tamaulipas to Quintana Roo), West Indies (Greater Antilles, Leeward Is), Venezuela

formerly included
moved to other genera: Actephila Amphicarpaea Gonatogyne Heterosavia Phyllanthopsis Pseudophyllanthus Wielandia

References

Phyllanthaceae genera
Phyllanthaceae